Phonotimpus is a genus of North American araneomorph spiders in the family Phrurolithidae. It was first described by Willis J. Gertsch and Louie Irby Davis in 1940, and placed with the Liocranidae. It was transferred to Corinnidae in 2002, then to the Phrurolithidae in 2014.

Species
 it contains thirty-two species, all found in Mexico:
Phonotimpus ahuacatlan Platnick, Chamé-Vázquez & Ibarra-Núñez, 2022 – Mexico
Phonotimpus arcitos Platnick, Chamé-Vázquez & Ibarra-Núñez, 2022 – Mexico
Phonotimpus boneti Platnick, Chamé-Vázquez & Ibarra-Núñez, 2022 – Mexico
Phonotimpus calenturas Platnick, Chamé-Vázquez & Ibarra-Núñez, 2022 – Mexico
Phonotimpus chipinque Platnick, Chamé-Vázquez & Ibarra-Núñez, 2022 – Mexico
Phonotimpus cielo Platnick, Chamé-Vázquez & Ibarra-Núñez, 2022 – Mexico
Phonotimpus cima Platnick, Chamé-Vázquez & Ibarra-Núñez, 2022 – Mexico
Phonotimpus cuauhtemoc Platnick, Chamé-Vázquez & Ibarra-Núñez, 2022 – Mexico
Phonotimpus cumbres Platnick, Chamé-Vázquez & Ibarra-Núñez, 2022 – Mexico
Phonotimpus elviejo Platnick, Chamé-Vázquez & Ibarra-Núñez, 2022 – Mexico
Phonotimpus escondida Platnick, Chamé-Vázquez & Ibarra-Núñez, 2022 – Mexico
Phonotimpus eutypus Gertsch & Davis, 1940 – Mexico
Phonotimpus farias Platnick, Chamé-Vázquez & Ibarra-Núñez, 2022 – Mexico
Phonotimpus frio Platnick, Chamé-Vázquez & Ibarra-Núñez, 2022 – Mexico
Phonotimpus gertschi Platnick, Chamé-Vázquez & Ibarra-Núñez, 2022 – Mexico
Phonotimpus llera Platnick, Chamé-Vázquez & Ibarra-Núñez, 2022 – Mexico
Phonotimpus marialuisae Chamé-Vázquez & Ibarra-Núñez, 2019 – Mexico
Phonotimpus padillai Chamé-Vázquez, Campuzano & Ibarra-Núñez, 2021 – Mexico
Phonotimpus pennimani Chamé-Vázquez, Ibarra-Núñez & Jiménez, 2018 – Mexico
Phonotimpus perra Platnick, Chamé-Vázquez & Ibarra-Núñez, 2022 – Mexico
Phonotimpus pozas Platnick, Chamé-Vázquez & Ibarra-Núñez, 2022 – Mexico
Phonotimpus puente Platnick, Chamé-Vázquez & Ibarra-Núñez, 2022 – Mexico
Phonotimpus revilla Platnick, Chamé-Vázquez & Ibarra-Núñez, 2022 – Mexico
Phonotimpus sanpedro Platnick, Chamé-Vázquez & Ibarra-Núñez, 2022 – Mexico
Phonotimpus schulzefenai (Chamberlin & Ivie, 1936) – Mexico
Phonotimpus separatus Gertsch & Davis, 1940 (type) – Mexico
Phonotimpus talquian Chamé-Vázquez, Ibarra-Núñez & Jiménez, 2018 – Mexico
Phonotimpus taman Platnick, Chamé-Vázquez & Ibarra-Núñez, 2022 – Mexico
Phonotimpus tetrico Platnick, Chamé-Vázquez & Ibarra-Núñez, 2022 – Mexico
Phonotimpus vacas Platnick, Chamé-Vázquez & Ibarra-Núñez, 2022 – Mexico
Phonotimpus valles Platnick, Chamé-Vázquez & Ibarra-Núñez, 2022 – Mexico
Phonotimpus xilitla Platnick, Chamé-Vázquez & Ibarra-Núñez, 2022 – Mexico

References

External links

Araneomorphae genera
Phrurolithidae